Prolyl endopeptidase-like is an enzyme that in humans is encoded by the PREPL gene.

PREPL belongs to the prolyloligopeptidase subfamily of serine peptidases (Parvari et al., 2005).[supplied by OMIM]

References

Further reading